Mathematical Programming is a peer-reviewed  scientific journal that was established in 1971 and is published by Springer Science+Business Media. It is the official journal of the Mathematical Optimization Society and consists of two series: A and B. The "A" series contains general publications, the "B" series focuses on topical mathematical programming areas. The editor-in-chief of Series A is Jon Lee (U Michigan); for Series B this is Sven Leyffer (Argonne).

History 
The journal has been published by Springer since January 1999. Mathematical Programming Studies is the predecessor of the Series B part of this journal.

Abstracting and indexing 
Mathematical Programming is abstracted and indexed in:

According to the Journal Citation Reports, the journal has a 2010 impact factor of 1.970.

References

External links 
 

Mathematics journals
English-language journals
Springer Science+Business Media academic journals
Publications established in 1971